Băiuț is a commune in Maramureș County, Transylvania, Romania. It is composed of three villages: Baiuț, Strâmbu-Băiuț (Kohóvölgy), and Poiana Botizii (Rákosfalva).

History
Over the course of its history, the village of Băiuț has been known as Lápos-Bánya (1630), Bajutze (1850) and Oláh Lápos-Bánya or Băiuța (1854). The names all derive from the Băiuț Mine, an important landmark in the area. The settlement was also known as Erzsebetbanya, since it used to be the location of many properties of Elizabeth Szilágyi, wife of John Hunyadi and mother of Matthias Corvinus.

The first documented mention of the village was in 1630, while mining activities are known to have taken place here since 1315. However, skeletal remains of animals and traces of human activity in the Poiana Botizii cave dating back to the Upper Paleolithic, indicate the area was populated long before that.

The village Poiana Botizii was first documented as Botiz in 1344. In 1750, it was known as Pojana Zseler, in 1830 it was renamed to Batspojana, Batiz Polyan in 1835, and finally, in 1850, it became known by the Romanian name Poiana Botizii.

Strâmbu-Băiuț village was previously named Strambulu (1835), Strimbuy (1850), Sztrimbuly, Strâmbul Băiuțului, Horgospataka – Pârâul lui Horgos and Kohovolgy – Valea Furnalului (1854), names tied to the iron mine and forge there.

Geography

It neighbors Budești commune to the north, Botiza commune to the east, Lăpuș commune to the south-east, Cupșeni commune to the south-west, as well as Cernești commune and the town of Cavnic to the west.

Villages

Băiuț commune is made up of three villages:

Băiuț (commune seat)
Poiana Botizii
Strâmbu-Băiuţ

Economy

Mining
Mining was the main economic activity in the area for much of its history. The gold here made the Băiuț mines an economically significant area in the Kingdom of Hungary. In the years after the Romanian Revolution, around 1,200 miners from Băiuț as well as nearby villages worked in the mines in the commune.

Around the year 2009, mining in Băiuț stopped. Economic life slowed down considerably, as employment fell.

On the 27th of March 2018, at around 3:30 am, a powerful noise followed by flooding with pit water from the shut-down Breiner Mine hit Băiuț.

The acidic water, polluted by iron, manganese, and zinc, made its way into the nearby Lăpuș River. Authorities estimate the wildlife damage at one tonne of killed fish. Following the accident, the Maramureș County Prefect, Vasile Moldovan, requested that the company responsible for shutting down the commune's mines, Conversmin, pay for the repopulation of the river.

Demographics

Ethnicity

At the 2011 census, 64.8% of inhabitants were Romanians and 34.8% Hungarians.

Religion

Administration and Politics
As a result of the 2020 Romanian local elections, Viorica Maciuc of the National Liberal Party was elected as mayor of Băiuț commune.

Natives
Ioan Giurgiu Patachi (1680–1727), Bishop of Făgăraș and Primate of the Romanian Greek Catholic Church
Mircea Roman (b. 1958), sculptor

Sights 

 Wooden Church in Poiana Botizii, built in the 19th century (1825), historic monument
 Black Pond Nature Reserve (1,00 ha), natural monument
 “Botiza Glade” Bone Cave Nature Reserve (0,50 ha), natural monument

References

Communes in Maramureș County
Localities in Transylvania